Tanousia is an extinct genus of freshwater snails with gills and an operculum, a gastropod mollusk in the family Lithoglyphidae.

Species 
Species within the genus Tanousia include:
 † Tanousia adnata (Neumayr in Herbich & Neumayr, 1875) 
 † Tanousia arminiensis (Jekelius, 1932)
 † Tanousia atava (Andrusov, 1890) 
 † Tanousia bodosensis (Roth, 1881) 
 † Tanousia carasiensis (Jekelius, 1944) 
 † Tanousia destefanii (Brusina, 1902) 
 Tanousia krasnenkovi Kondrashov, 2007 - from the Middle Pleistocene
 Tanousia lithoglyphoides (Girotti, 1972)
 Tanousia runtoniana (Sandberger, 1880)
 † Tanousia schlickumi Schütt, 1976
 Tanousia stenostoma (Nordmann, 1901)
 † Tanousia stironensis Esu, 2008 - from Early Pleistocene of Northern Italy
 Tanousia subovata (Settepassi & Verdel, 1965)
 Tanousia zrmanjae (Brusina, 1866)

References

 Wenz, W. (1938-1944). Gastropoda. Teil 1: Allgemeiner Teil und Prosobranchia. 1-1639. In: Schindewolf, O.H. (Ed.) Handbuch der Paläozoologie, Band 6. Verlag Gebrüder Bornträger, Berlin. page(s): 568

External links 

Hydrobiidae
Pleistocene gastropods